Alor Pongsu is a state constituency in Perak, Malaysia, that has been represented in the Perak State Legislative Assembly.

Demographics

History

Polling districts
According to the federal gazette issued on 31 October 2022, the Alor Pongsu constituency is divided into 17 polling districts.

Representation history

Election result

References

 

Perak State Legislative Assembly
Perak state constituencies